Benjamin Galluzzo is an associate professor in the Institute for STEM Education at Clarkson University.

Professional career 
Galluzzo received his PhD in applied mathematical and computational sciences from the University of Iowa in 2011. His dissertation, A finite-difference based approach to solving the subsurface fluid flow equation in heterogeneous media, was supervised by Lihe Wang.  He received a master's degree in mathematical finance from Boston University.  His research focuses on the development of strategies and best practices for bringing innovation and active learning into K-16 STEM classrooms, with particular emphasis on mathematical modeling.

Awards and honours 
Galluzzo was awarded the Henry L. Alder Award from the Mathematical Association of America in 2016.

References

External links 
 Home page for Benjamin Galluzzo
 Institute for STEM Education at Clarkson University

American mathematicians
Applied mathematicians
University of Iowa alumni
Clarkson University faculty
Living people

Year of birth missing (living people)